Super Natural is the debut studio album by English band Jim Jones and The Righteous Mind. It was released on 12 May 2017 through MaSonic Records.

Accolades

Track listing

References

2017 debut albums